Las Herencias is a municipality located in the province of Toledo, Castile-La Mancha, Spain. According to the 2006 census (INE), the municipality has a population of 759 inhabitants. . It adjoins the municipalities of Talavera de la Reina in the north, La Pueblanueva and  San Bartolomé de las Abiertas at the east, Alcaudete de la Jara and Jara Belvís the south, and  Calera y Chozas to the west, all of Toledo.

Villages
El Membrillo

References

External links
Ruta 10: Las Herencias, El Membrillo, Alcaudete de la Jara, Belvís de la Jara, Las Herencias

Municipalities in the Province of Toledo